was a railway station on the Sasshō Line in Shintotsukawa, Hokkaidō, Japan, operated by the Hokkaido Railway Company (JR Hokkaido).

Lines

Station layout
The station had a side platform serving one track. The station building was located next to the platform.

Adjacent stations

History
The station opened on 10 October 1931.

In December 2018, it was announced that the station would be closed on May 7, 2020, along with the rest of the non-electrified section of the Sasshō Line. The actual last service was on April 17, 2020, amid the COVID-19 outbreak.

See also
List of railway stations in Japan

References

Railway stations in Hokkaido Prefecture
Railway stations in Japan opened in 1931
Railway stations closed in 2020